Mount Sibiryakov is an isolated mountain about  south of Mount Humble of the Raggatt Mountains, in Enderby Land. Rock outcrops here were investigated by the Soviet Antarctic Expedition of 1961-62 who named the feature for the Soviet icebreaker Sibiryakov.

Mountains of Enderby Land